First Place is a Japanese pop band under the Being Inc. label.

History
The formation of band has started in 2014 with members Kento and Taihei as a unit. In 2015 Ryoma and in 2017 Kaito jointed in the band. For the four years they have been active as an live street artist. In May, Kaito played main role in the musical Yume de Aima. In August 2018, they've made major debut with single Sadame which served as an ending theme for Anime television series Detective Conan under Being Inc. label. The album debuted at number 8 on the Oricon Weekly Single Chart and charted for 11 weeks.

In November 2018, they've held one-man live in AiiA Theater. In June 2019 they will release their first mini album L.D. Love with seven recorded tracks, including their debut single. Kaito provided lyrics for album track L.D.Love.

On 13 November 2019 is scheduled to release their second single Snow Light.

Members
The band consist of four members:
 Ryoma - leader (birth 11 March 1995)
 Kento - eldest member (birth 9 October 1994)
 Taihei - (birth 21 August 1996)
 Kaito - youngest member (birth 18 October 1998)

Discography 
The band have released one mini-album and two singles.

Singles

Mini albums

Interview
Utaten: Sadame
Musicvoice: Sadame

Television appearances
LiveB (TBS)
Buzzrhythm02 (NTV)

References

External links
First Place official Web site 
 	

Being Inc. artists
Living people
Japanese pop music groups
Anime musicians
Musical groups established in 2014
2014 establishments in Japan
Year of birth missing (living people)